Jåttå Station was a railway station located at Jåttå in Stavanger municipality in Rogaland county, Norway. The station was served by the Jæren Commuter Rail between Stavanger and Egersund.

History
The station was opened along with the football stadium in 2004. It closed on 6 January 2008 when it was replaced by the nearby Jåttåvågen Station, the first part of the new double track between Stavanger and Sandnes to open.

Railway stations on the Sørlandet Line
Railway stations in Stavanger
Railway stations opened in 2004
Railway stations closed in 2008
Disused railway stations in Norway
2004 establishments in Norway
2008 disestablishments in Norway